Tariq Hamed Abdulmajeed (Arabic:طارق حامد عبد المجيد) (born 11 June 1995) is a Qatari born-Egyptian footballer. He currently plays as a midfielder for Al Bidda.

Career
He formerly played for Al-Gharafa, Muaither, Al-Markhiya, Al-Arabi,Lusail and Al Bidda.

External links

References

Living people
1995 births
Qatari footballers
Qatari people of Egyptian descent
Naturalised citizens of Qatar
Al-Gharafa SC players
Muaither SC players
Al-Markhiya SC players
Al-Arabi SC (Qatar) players
Lusail SC players
Al Bidda SC players
Qatar Stars League players
Qatari Second Division players
Association football midfielders
Place of birth missing (living people)